Devorah is a moshav in northern Israel. Located in the Ta'anakh region, near Afula, it falls under the jurisdiction of Gilboa Regional Council.

History
The village was founded in 1956 by immigrants from Morocco as part of a program to populate the Ta'anakh region. It is named after the prophet Devorah (Deborah) (Judges 4:4), who defeated Sisera in the Book of Judges.

References

Moshavim
Populated places in Northern District (Israel)
Populated places established in 1956
1956 establishments in Israel
Moroccan-Jewish culture in Israel